Walgreen Peak is a prominent rock peak (570 m) which forms the northwest extremity of the Sarnoff Mountains, in the Ford Ranges of Marie Byrd Land. It was mapped by the United States Antarctic Service Expedition (1939–41), under the command of Rear Admiral Richard E. Byrd, and was named for Charles R. (Buck) Walgreen Jr., vice president of Walgreen Co., who contributed malted milk powder used on the expedition.

See also
List of mountains of East Antarctica

Mountains of Marie Byrd Land